is a Japanese video game and online game developer and publisher, based in Shinagawa, Tokyo, and founded on 7 June 1978. They are best known for their Cotton series of shooter games, Zoo Keeper and others.

Games developed and/or published 

SuperLite Series
SuperLite 1500 Series (Game Boy Advance)
Lode Runner (GBA)
Asuka 120% Final BURNING Fest.
Asuka 120% Return BURNING Fest.
ADVANCED V.G.2
A-Train IV
SuperLite 3in1 Series
SuperLite Gold Series
SuperLite 2000 Series (PlayStation 2)
Ever 17: The Out of Infinity
Remember 11: The Age of Infinity
Ai Yori Aoshi
Monochrome
SuperLite 2500 Series (Nintendo DS)
Brickdown
Crimson Room (DS port of the Flash escape the room game of the same name)
Custom Mahjong
Gekikara Nanpure 2500 Mon
Joshikousei Nigeru! Shinrei Puzzle Gakuen
Tokyo Odaiba Casino
Chotto-Aima no Colpile DS
Quiz no Tabi

See also
Simple series - a series of inexpensive games published by D3, similar to Success's SuperLite series.

References

External links
  

Software companies based in Tokyo

Video game companies established in 1978
Video game companies of Japan
Video game development companies
Video game publishers
Japanese companies established in 1978